Acroneuriinae is a subfamily of common stoneflies in the family Perlidae. There are about 32 genera and about 520 described species in Acroneuriinae.

Genera
These 11 genera belong to the subfamily Acroneuriinae.
 Acroneuria Pictet, 1841
 Anacroneuria Klapálek, 1909
 Attaneuria Ricker, 1954
 Beloneuria Needham and Claassen, 1925
 Calineuria Ricker, 1954
 Doroneuria Needham & Claassen, 1925
 Eccoptura Klapálek, 1921
 Hansonoperla Nelson, 1979
 Hesperoperla Banks, 1938
 Perlesta Banks, 1906
 Perlinella Banks, 1900

References

Further reading

External links

 

Perlidae